The 7217th Air Division (7217th AD) was an air division of the United States Air Force.  Its last assignment was with the United States Air Forces in Europe, being stationed at Ankara Air Station, Turkey.  It was inactivated on 9 September 1970.

The division provided logistical support for all American armed forces, and military activities in Turkey, Greece, and Crete. Its area of responsibility extended from the Black Sea to Ethiopia and from Greece to Pakistan.

History
In April 1953, the Joint Chiefs of Staff assigned responsibility for the logistical support of all U.S. forces in Turkey to Headquarters, United States Air Forces in Europe. In turn, USAFE assigned this responsibility to the 7206th Air Base Squadron (ABS) at Hellenikon Air Base, Greece. On 1 April 1954, Detachment 1 of the 7206 ABS was activated in Ankara with a staff of one officer and one airman. This extremely modest force was absorbed by an advanced echelon of the Seventeenth Air Force deployed from Rabat, Morocco in December 1954. On 15 May 1955, Headquarters Seventeenth Air Force activated Headquarters 7217th Support Group in Ankara. This unit was referred to as Headquarters The United States Logistics Group (HQ TUSLOG). Later that summer, on 25 July, Detachment 1 of the 7206 ABS was discontinued and on 1 August, the 7217 ABS was activated with a staff of five officers, 39 airmen, and four Turkish nationals. The 7217 ABS was designated as TUSLOG Detachment 1 and at approximately the same time, in accordance with the wishes of the Turkish Government, all other US military units and civilian components in Turkey were also given designations as TUSLOG detachments.

The 7217th Air Division was established as a result of the 1958 Lebanon Crisis during which the US sent aircraft and troops to Incirlik Air Base, Turkey in support of the Marines dispatched to Lebanon. At the same time the United States Ambassador to Turkey (the US Embassy) and its agencies were demanding more and more services. As a result, on 7 August 1959, USAFE reversed its position and elevated HQ TUSLOG to be the 7217th Air Division. The rank of the commander of HQ TUSLOG was then raised from colonel to brigadier general.

Meanwhile, a number of studies were conducted in order to find ways of reducing and streamlining the US command structure in Turkey, especially after the Secretary of the Air Force visited that country in 1963 and concluded that the separate NATO-CENTO-European Command-USAFE command structure was too cumbersome. One result of these studies was that in July 1964, TUSLOG took over full responsibility for several functions previously shared with the Joint U.S. Military Mission for Aid to Turkey (JUSMMAT) and other organizations: air transportation, motor pools, public information, supply logistical support, legal counsel, and signals communications. This led to a decrease in the number of personnel at JUSMMAT, an increase for TUSLOG, and a net decrease in the number of Americans in Ankara.

The 7217th provided facilities and training for rotational tactical fighter squadrons, maintenance for aircraft assigned to Military Aid and Assistance Groups (MAAGs) in the Middle East, and logistical support for occasional unscheduled aerial operations. In 1965 it had support responsibilities in Turkey, Greece, Crete, Pakistan, Iran, Saudi Arabia, India, Ethiopia (possibly at Kagnew Station?), Lebanon and Israel. That year, it participated in Exercise Deep Furrow '65 (NATO), and prepared for exercises SHABAZ XII AND NEJAT II, small scale CENTO search and rescue exercises with Iran and Pakistan.

By the mid-1960s, demands on the defense budget and manpower by the Vietnam War forced the US to reconsider its military priorities in other parts of the world. In 1966, Senate majority leader Mike Mansfield began a campaign to reduce unilaterally US troop levels in Europe. Following this, Secretary of Defense Clark Clifford initiated a program for the Reduction of Costs and Forces in Europe (REDCOSTE) in 1968. Although a change in administrations occurred in the same year, this program conformed to the Nixon policy of lowering the profile of American forces abroad.

Consequently, the US began to eliminate or consolidate many of its operations in Turkey. Between 1969 and 1973, for instance, sites at Samsun and Trabzon were turned over to the Turkish government. In addition, Cigli Air Base, which since 1963 had been used by USAF rotational squadrons, was turned over to the Turkish Air Force in 1970. The US continued, however, to fund the maintenance of numerous facilities at that base. Altogether, between 1967 and 1970, the number of Americans in Turkey dropped from 24,000 to 15,000.

The cutbacks in forces in Turkey naturally had a major effect on TUSLOG. The headquarters in Ankara shrank to a fraction of its former size. On 9 September, it was inactivated as the 7217th Air Division and the next day reestablished as Detachment 1 of Headquarters Sixteenth Air Force.

TUSLOG itself was inactivated on 16 July 1992.

After the end of the Cold War, most of the munitions support units in Turkey were inactivated. On 25 April 1996, detachments at Balikesir and Akinci were inactivated. The 39th Munitions Support Squadron at Balikesir, and the 739th Munitions Support Squadron at Akinci had maintained nuclear weapons for NATO requirements in the region since the mid 1960s. In April 1995, however, USAFE announced both units' closure. With the disappearance of the Soviet threat, any future support required was to be provided by units at Incirlik alone. During normal operations, each unit boasted 110 military personnel. On the final day, the numbers dwindled to five people at Balikesir and three at Akinci. Since 1996, all other nuclear storage sites have been vacated except the base at Incirlik.

Lineage
 Established as 7217 Air Division (Command), and organized, on 7 August 1959
 Reduced in organization level to Detachment 1, HQ Sixteenth Air Force,  9 September 1970

Assignments
 United States Air Forces in Europe
 Seventeenth Air Force, 7 August 1959
 United States Air Forces in Europe, 15 November 1959 – 9 September 1970.

Units/Stations
 39th Tactical Group, Incirlik Air Base, 1 May 1958 - 16 July 1992
 41st Tactical Group, Cigli Air Base, Turkey, 1 April 1966 – 1 July 1970
 7217th Air Base Group, Ankara Air Station, 7 August 1959 – 9 September 1970
 39th Munitions Support Squadron (1980s-1990s)
 739th Munitions Support Squadron (1980s-1990s)
 7241st Air Base Squadron, Izmir Air Station, 15 November 1955 – 30 September 1990
 7022d Air Base Squadron, Pirinclik Air Base, 5 August 1966 – 31 December 1994
 7391st Munitions Support Squadron, Balikesir Air Base, 1 October 1966 – 31 December 1994
 7392d Munitions Support Squadron, Eskisehir Air Base, 20 March 1962 – 30 September 1990
 7393d Munitions Support Squadron, Murted, 1 July 1965 – 31 December 1994
 7394th Munitions Support Squadron, Malatya Erhaç Airport, 1 June 1963

Notes

References and further sources
 *Simon Duke, U.S. Military Forces and Installations in Europe, Oxford University Press for SIPRI, 1989
 Gary Leiser, HQ TUSLOG: A Brief History, HQ TUSLOG, Ankara, Turkey, revised October 1987
 A Brief History of U.S. Forces in Turkey, 1947-1978. Lawrence R. Benson, 1978. 116 pp. (Listed in Guide to Air Force Historical Literature, 1943 – 1983, 29 August 1983, declassified in full and released 23 July 2008.
 7217th Air Division Factsheet

Military units and formations established in 1959
Military units and formations disestablished in 1970
Air 7217
1959 establishments in Turkey
1970 disestablishments in Turkey